Thakurnagar High School  is a boys' school in Thakurnagar, North 24 Parganas, West Bengal, India. The school was established in 1941.

About School
It is administered by the West Bengal Board of Secondary Education. It is one of the oldest schools of West Bengal. The school was founded by Pramath Ranjan Thakur.

Subjects 
The school offers a full curriculum including Bengali, English, History, Geography, Mathematics, Physics, Chemistry, Bio-science, Philosophy, Economics, Political Science, Accountancy, Business, Economics, Mathematics, Eco-Geography and Sanskrit.

See also
Education in India
List of schools in India
Education in West Bengal

References

External links

Boys' schools in India
High schools and secondary schools in West Bengal
Schools in North 24 Parganas district
Educational institutions established in 1941
1941 establishments in India